The Penglai Waterfall is a waterfall in Gukeng Township, Yunlin County, Taiwan.

Geology
The waterfall is located in Shibi Valley. It is part of Jhugao River at Jhugao River basin. Located at an elevation of 1,200 meters above sea level, it spans over a height of 200 meters.

Facilities
The waterfall used to feature a cable car system but was destroyed during the 921 earthquake in 1999.

See also
 List of waterfalls

References

Landforms of Yunlin County
Waterfalls of Taiwan